Melanocercops elaphopa is a moth of the family Gracillariidae. It is known from Karnataka, India, and from Nepal.

The larvae feed on Ficus species, including Ficus asperrima, Ficus palmatus and Ficus religiosa. They mine the leaves of their host plant. The mine has the form of a small irregular gallery ending in a blotch beneath the upper surface of the leaf.

References

Acrocercopinae
Moths of Asia
Moths described in 1914